Imperial Conferences (Colonial Conferences before 1907) were periodic gatherings of government leaders from the self-governing colonies and dominions of the British Empire between 1887 and 1937, before the establishment of regular Meetings of Commonwealth Prime Ministers in 1944. They were held in 1887, 1894, 1897, 1902, 1907, 1911, 1921, 1923, 1926, 1930, 1932 and 1937.

All the conferences were held in London, the seat of the Empire, except for the 1894 and 1932 conferences which were held in Ottawa, the capital of the senior Dominion of the Crown.  The 1907 conference changed the name of the meetings to Imperial Conferences and agreed that the meetings should henceforth be regular rather than taking place while overseas statesmen were visiting London for royal occasions (e.g. jubilees and coronations).

List of conferences

Notable meetings 
Originally instituted to emphasise imperial unity, as time went on, the conferences became a key forum for dominion governments to assert the desire for removing the remaining vestiges of their colonial status. The conference of 1926 agreed to the Balfour Declaration, which acknowledged that the dominions would henceforth rank as equals to the United Kingdom, as members of the 'British Commonwealth of Nations'.

The conference of 1930 decided to abolish the legislative supremacy of the British Parliament as it was expressed through the Colonial Laws Validity Act and other Imperial Acts. The statesmen recommended that a declaratory enactment of Parliament, which became the Statute of Westminster 1931, be passed with the consent of the dominions, but some dominions did not ratify the statute until some years afterwards. The 1930 conference was notable, too, for the attendance of Southern Rhodesia, despite it being a self-governing colony, not a dominion.

Towards Commonwealth meetings 
As World War II drew to a close, Imperial Conferences were replaced by Commonwealth Prime Ministers' Conferences, with 17 such meetings occurring from 1944 until 1969, all but one of the meetings occurred in London. The gatherings were renamed Commonwealth Heads of Government Meetings (CHOGM) in 1971 and were henceforth held every two years with hosting duties rotating around the Commonwealth.

See also 

 British Empire Economic Conference (1932)
 Commonwealth Heads of Government Meeting
 First Colonial Conference
 Historiography of the British Empire
 Imperial War Cabinet

Footnotes

Further reading
 Keith, A.B. The Government of the British Empire (1935).
 Olson, James S., ed. Historical Dictionary of European Imperialism (1991) pp 292–300; Covers 1907, 1911, 1921, 1923, 1926 and 1932
 Palmer, G.E.H. Constitution and Cooperation in the British Commonwealth (1934)